Mount Burnham is a  mountain summit located in British Columbia, Canada.

Description

Mount Burnham is the easternmost peak in the Gold Range which is a subrange of the Monashee Mountains. Precipitation runoff from the mountain drains east to Upper Arrow Lake which is a reservoir of the Columbia River.

Etymology

The mountain is named after Brigadier-General Frederick William Elias Burnham (1872–1955) who operated the nearby Halcyon Hot Springs from 1924 until he perished in the fire that destroyed the Halcyon Hot Springs Hotel on February 19, 1955. He was a surgeon, philanthropist and a tireless worker against rheumatic and arthritic diseases. He had a distinguished record in World War I. The mountain's toponym was officially adopted November 14, 1963, by the Geographical Names Board of Canada.

Climate

Based on the Köppen climate classification, Mount Burnham is located in a subarctic climate zone with cold, snowy winters, and mild summers. Winter temperatures can drop below −20 °C with wind chill factors below −30 °C. This climate supports a small glacier on the north slope.

See also

Geography of British Columbia

Gallery

References

External links
 Mount Burnham: Weather forecast
 Frederick Burnham (photo): Arrow Lakes Historical Society
 Frederick Burnham: Find a Grave

Two-thousanders of British Columbia
Monashee Mountains
Columbia Country
Kootenay Land District